Clarion Township is one of twenty-five townships in Bureau County, Illinois, USA.  As of the 2020 census, its population was 410 and it contained 177 housing units.

Geography

Cities
 La Moille (east quarter)

Unincorporated towns
 Clarion
 Wendel
(This list is based on USGS data and may include former settlements.)Both locations were railroad stations with no residential buildings immediately adjacent. Clarion was a station on what is now the Burlington Northern mainline a few miles southwest of Mendota.  No siding or any visible sign of a station exists—and has not since at least 1950.  Wendel station was on a Burlington Northern branch line about four miles west of Mendota.  A grain elevator (at one time operated by the Wendel family) was the only structure other than nearby farmsteads.  The branch railroad was abandoned and all rails removed circa 1975.

Cemeteries
The township contains these five cemeteries: Clarion Lutheran, Erbes, German Evangelical, Hetzler and Hill.

Major highways
  US Route 34
  Illinois Route 89

Airports and landing strips
 Ivan E Bauer Heliport
 Keutzer Airport
 Otterbach Farm Airport

Demographics
As of the 2020 census there were 410 people, 98 households, and 68 families residing in the township. The racial makeup of the township was 91.71% White, 0.49% African American, 0.49% Native American, 0.49% Asian, 0.00% Pacific Islander, 3.41% from other races, and 3.41% from two or more races. Hispanic or Latino of any race were 4.88% of the population.

There were 98 households, out of which 30.60% had children under the age of 18 living with them, 66.33% were married couples living together, 3.06% had a female householder with no spouse present, and 30.61% were non-families. 18.40% of all households were made up of individuals, and 7.10% had someone living alone who was 65 years of age or older. The average household size was 2.44 and the average family size was 2.82.

The township's age distribution consisted of 17.6% under the age of 18, 2.1% from 18 to 24, 14.3% from 25 to 44, 51.4% from 45 to 64, and 14.6% who were 65 years of age or older. The median age was 50.7 years. For every 100 females, there were 81.1 males. For every 100 females age 18 and over, there were 82.4 males.

The median income for a household in the township was $102,500, and the median income for a family was $109,107. Males had a median income of $46,875 versus $43,125 for females. The per capita income for the township was $43,908. About 4.4% of families and 6.3% of the population were below the poverty line, including 16.7% of those under age 18 and none of those age 65 or over.

School districts
 La Moille Community Unit School District 303
 Mendota Elementary District 289
 Mendota High School District 280

Political districts
 Illinois' 11th congressional district
 State House District 76
 State House District 90
 State Senate District 38
 State Senate District 45

References
 
 United States Census Bureau 2007 TIGER/Line Shapefiles
 United States National Atlas

External links
 City-Data.com
 Illinois State Archives

Townships in Bureau County, Illinois
Populated places established in 1849
Townships in Illinois
1849 establishments in Illinois